Clarissa Ward (born January 31, 1980) is a British-American television journalist, who is currently chief international correspondent for CNN. She was with CBS News, based in London. Before her CBS News position, Ward was a Moscow-based news correspondent for ABC News programs.

Early life 
Ward was born in London to a British father and American mother. She grew up in London and New York City and attended the Godstowe and Wycombe Abbey boarding schools in England. She graduated from Yale University in 2002 and holds an honorary doctor of letters degree from Middlebury College.

Career

Early career 
Ward began her career as an overnight desk assistant at Fox News in 2003. From 2004 to 2005, she was an assignment editor for Fox News in New York City. She worked on the international desk coordinating coverage for stories such as the capture of Saddam Hussein, the Indian Ocean tsunami in 2004 and the deaths of Yasir Arafat and Pope John Paul II. In 2006, she worked as a field producer for Fox News. She produced coverage of the Israeli-Lebanese war, the kidnapping of Gilad Shalit and subsequent Israeli military action in the Gaza Strip, the trial of Saddam Hussein and the 2005 Iraqi constitutional referendum.

Prior to October 2007, Ward was based in Beirut and worked as a correspondent for Fox News. She covered the execution of Saddam Hussein, the Iraq War troop surge of 2007, the Beirut Arab University riots and the 2007 Bikfaya bombings. She conducted interviews with notable figures such as Gen. David Petraeus, Iraqi Deputy Prime Minister Barham Salih and Lebanese President Emile Lahoud. She also spent time embedded with the U.S. military in Iraq, most notably in Baqubah.

ABC News 
From October 2007 to October 2010, Ward was an ABC News correspondent based in Moscow. She reported from Russia for all ABC News broadcasts and platforms, including World News with Charles Gibson, Nightline and Good Morning America, as well as ABC News Radio, and ABC News Now. On assignment in Russia, she covered the 2008 Russian presidential election. She was in Georgia at the time of the Russian intervention into Georgian territory. She was transferred to Beijing to serve as the ABC News Asian Correspondent, where she covered the 2011 Tōhoku earthquake and tsunami in Japan. She has also covered the war in Afghanistan.

CBS News 
Ward's CBS career started as the network's foreign news correspondent in October 2011. She was a contributor for 60 Minutes and served as a fill-in anchor on CBS This Morning beginning in January 2014.

CNN
On September 21, 2015, CNN announced that Ward was joining the network and reporting for all of CNN's platforms, and would remain based in London. With more than a decade as a war correspondent, on August 8, 2016, she spoke at a United Nations Security Council meeting on the situation in the civil war-torn Aleppo.

In July 2018, CNN named her its chief international correspondent, succeeding Christiane Amanpour. In 2019, she became one of the first Western journalists to report on the life in areas controlled by the Taliban in Afghanistan. In August 2020, reports emerged that she and her team were under surveillance while in the Central African Republic in May 2019.

In December 2020, in a joint investigation by The Insider and Bellingcat in co-operation with CNN and Der Spiegel, she reported how Russian Federal Security Service (FSB) members stalked Alexei Navalny for years, including just before his poisoning in August 2020. The investigation detailed a special unit of the FSB specializing in chemical substances and investigators tracked members of the unit using telecom and travel data.

In February 2022, CNN deployed Ward, initially, to the city of Kharkiv in order to cover the first moves from Russian Invasion in Ukraine. After the first days of war, she was relocated to Kyiv, where she engaged in a series of wartime reports on the advance of Russian troops and the flight of Ukrainian refugees away from Russian artillery strikes. She was among the journalists who travelled to Ukraine to give insights into the humanitarian situation for children and wounded civilians in Ukrainian hospitals amidst the ongoing conflict.

Awards 
Ward received a Peabody Award on May 21, 2012, in New York City for her journalistic coverage inside Syria during the Syrian uprising. In October 2014, Washington State University announced that she would receive the 2015 Murrow Award for International Reporting in April 2015. She has also received seven Emmy Awards, an Alfred I. duPont-Columbia Silver Baton, and honors from the Radio and Television Correspondents' Association.

Personal life 
Ward was married in November 2016 at London's Chelsea Old Town Hall to Philipp von Bernstorff, a fund manager, whom she met at a 2007 dinner party in Moscow. They have two children. Ward knows French and Italian, is basically fluent in Russian, Arabic, and Spanish, and knows basic Mandarin Chinese.

Bibliography

References

External links 
 Clarissa Ward  Video produced by Makers: Women Who Make America

1980 births
Living people
American expatriates in Russia
American expatriates in the United Kingdom
American people of the Iraq War
American television reporters and correspondents
American women war correspondents
CNN people
Peabody Award winners
War correspondents of the Iraq War
Yale University alumni
American people of British descent
American women television journalists
Journalists from London
Women in the Iraq War
CBS News people
21st-century American women